Uganda competed at the 1984 Summer Olympics in Los Angeles, United States. 26 competitors, 24 men and 2 women, took part in 24 events in 5 sports.

Athletics

Men
Track & road events

Field events

Women
Track & road events

Boxing

Men

Cycling

Two cyclists represented Uganda in 1984.
Road

Swimming

Men

Weightlifting

Men

References

External links
 Official Olympic Reports

Nations at the 1984 Summer Olympics
1984
1984 in Ugandan sport